Mark Alexander (born 1966) is a British artist living and working in Berlin.

Biography
Born in the small market town of Horsham, West Sussex, Alexander came to painting relatively late, receiving his BFA from Oxford University as a mature student in 1996, despite his lack of formal education or training.
Alexander was an artist in residence at the Beethoven Haus in Bonn, Germany (2014–15).

Alexander has nine of his works included in the permanent collection of The Centre Pompidou Foundation, Paris.

Style and works
Alexander's style is characterised by meticulous labour-intensive brushwork.  His art often reinvents the icons of the past, recasting such well-known cultural objects as the Shield of Achilles, Van Gogh's famous portrait of the French physician Paul Gachet, and ruined statues of saints in New College, Oxford.  Alexander's painstaking technique, requiring many months to complete a single work, has attracted both praise and befuddlement from critics.  ‘Mark Alexander’, according to the Daily Telegraph newspaper, ‘cuts an enigmatic figure in the art world, attracting the interest of some of its most influential collectors.  He has produced only twenty-two paintings since his career began in 1993.  This is due not to idleness but to a sort of manic fastidiousness.’ ‘The works of this self-taught artist combine elements of eighteenth-century classicism, nineteenth-century photography, and modern photo-realism.’

Alexander's portraits include ones of the contemporary British poet Craig Raine (b. 1944) and the celebrated English architect Sir Thomas Graham Jackson.  His recent copies of Van Gogh's notorious Portrait of Dr Gachet, in which he has siphoned off all of the colour of the original, replacing it with heavy black pigment, caused considerable controversy when exhibited in London in 2005.

Alexander's Red Mannheim altarpieces have been included in the 2010 St Paul's cathedral art programme along with Anthony Gormley, Damien Hirst, Bill Viola, Yoko Ono and others.

Exhibitions
Selected Solo Exhibitions:
 2021 Mark Alexander: Love Between the Atoms SAUVAGE, Düsseldorf, Germany
 2016 Wrestling with Angels Gemäldegalerie, Berlin, Germany
 2015 Credo Beethoven-Haus, Bonn, Germany
 2014-2015 "Red and White Mannheim" Bode Museum, Berlin, Germany
 2014 "Mannheim Paintings" Galerie Bastian, Berlin, Germany
 2013 "American Bog" Broadway 1602 Gallery, New York, USA
 2012 "Ground and Unground" Wilkinson Gallery, London, UK
 2010 "Red Mannheim" St.Paul's Cathedral, London, UK
 2009  The Blacker Gold Haunch of Venison Gallery, Berlin, Germany
 2005	The Bigger Victory: Retrospective (Haunch of Venison Gallery), London
 2001	The Abhorrence of Virtue and the Love of Vice (Anthony Reynolds Gallery, London)
 1999	Ozymandias (Anthony Reynolds Gallery, London)
Selected Group Exhibitions:
 2020 Hotel Beethoven BOZAR Brussels, Brussels, Belgium
 2019-2020 "In bester Gesellschaft:Joseph Stielers Beethoven-Portrat und seine Geschichte"  Beethoven Haus, Bonn, Germany
 2019 "Android.Radical.Dream.Grid.Algorithm.Real.Data.God.AI...." Projektraum-Kinstquartier Bethanien, Berlin, Germany
 2019 "Contemplating the Spiritual in Contemporary Art" Rosenfeld Porcini, London, UK
 2019 "Portraits Beyond a Likeness" Agnew's Gallery, London, UK
 2018 "THE TIMES THEY ARE A-CHANGIN'" Galerie Bastian, Berlin, Germany
 2018 "Summer Exhibition" Royal Academy, London UK
 2016 " LUDWIG VAN: Le Mythe Beethoven"  Philharmonie de Paris, Paris, France
 2016 " Collection of Thea Westreich Wagner and Ethan Wagner"  The Centre Pompidou, Paris, France
 2016 "At The Still Point" Galerie Bastian, Berlin, Germany
 2016 "Herd of Sheffield" The Children's Hospital Charity, Sheffield, UK
 2016 "One Egg a Day" PantaleonsMuehlengasse, Köln, Germany
 2015 "Beethoven im Blick moderner und historischer Kunst" Kulturhaus Zanders Bergisch Gladbach, Germany
 2015 "Das Verschwundene Museum" Bode Museum, Berlin, Germany
 2013 "Green Flower Street" Tatiana Kourochkina Galleria D"Art, Istanbul, Turkey
 2012 "power FLOWER:Blüten Zauber in der Zeitgenössischen Kunst", Galerie ABTART, Stuttgart, Germany
 2011  "Ars Apocalipsis, Kunst und Kollaps" Kunstverein Kreis, Veerhoffhaus, Gütersloh, Germany
 2011 "Play-The Frivolous and the Serious" ME Collectors Room, Berlin Germany
 2010 "The Library of Babel - In and Out of Place" 176 Zabludowicz Collection, London, UK
 2010 "Summer Exhibition" Royal Academy of Art, London, UK
 2010 "Flowers, Death And Butterflies" Ausstellungsraum Céline und Heiner Bastian, Berlin, Germany
 2010 "Poetic Justice" Moss Gallery, New York, USA
 2008 "Summer Exhibition" Royal Academy of Art, London, UK
 2002	The Galleries Show (The Royal Academy of Art, London)
 2002	On the Move (Kunsthalle, Basel)
 2001	I am a Camera (Saatchi Gallery, London)
 1998	Black (with Lucia Nogueira) (Anthony Reynolds Gallery, London)

References

External links
 

20th-century English painters
English male painters
21st-century English painters
Living people
1966 births
Alumni of the Ruskin School of Art
20th-century English male artists
21st-century English male artists